The 1994 NCAA Women's Division I Swimming and Diving Championships were contested at the 13th annual NCAA-sanctioned swim meet to determine the team and individual national champions of Division I women's collegiate swimming and diving in the United States. 

This year's events were hosted at the Indiana University Natatorium in Indianapolis, Indiana. 

Stanford again topped the team standings, finishing 91 points ahead of Texas; it was the Cardinal's third consecutive and fifth overall women's team title. This marked the seventh time that Stanford and Texas finished in the top two.

Team standings
Note: Top 10 only
(DC) = Defending champions
Full results

See also
List of college swimming and diving teams

References

NCAA Division I Swimming And Diving Championships
NCAA Division I Swimming And Diving Championships
NCAA Division I Women's Swimming and Diving Championships